The Beckley Foundation is a UK-based think tank and UN-accredited NGO, dedicated to activating global drug policy reform and initiating scientific research into psychoactive substances. The foundation is a charitable trust which collaborates with leading scientific and political institutions worldwide to design and develop research and global policy initiatives. It also investigates consciousness and its modulation from a multidisciplinary perspective, working in collaboration with scientists. The foundation is based at Beckley Park near Oxford, United Kingdom. It was founded in 1998, and is directed by Amanda Feilding, Countess of Wemyss.

Background

Since its creation by Amanda Feilding in 1998, the Beckley Foundation has been at the forefront of global drug policy reform and scientific research into psychoactive substances.

The Beckley Foundation Scientific Programme initiates, designs and conducts research into the effects of psychoactive substances on the brain, in order to minimise their potential harms, learn more about consciousness and brain function, and discover and explore their therapeutic potential. Recent research includes collaborations with Dr Jordi Riba at Sant Pau Hospital on ayahuasca, Professor David Nutt at Imperial College on the effects of psychedelics on cerebral blood flow, Professor Valerie Curran at University College London on the effects of cannabis on the brain with a view to possible therapeutic applications and with Professor Roland R. Griffiths at Johns Hopkins University studying the effects of psilocybin in 
combating addiction.

The Beckley Foundation Policy Programme is dedicated to improving national and global drug policies, through research that increases understanding of the health, social and fiscal implications of drug policy, and the development of new evidence-based and rational approaches. It brings together country representatives, science and policy experts at international seminars in order to discuss alternative drug policy, and commissions and disseminates reports to open up and facilitate debate among policy-makers and the public.

Policy

Roadmaps to Regulation: Coca/Cocaine
Following the election of Gustavo Petro in August 2022, and in advance of the publication of their full “Cocaine Papers” in late 2022, the Foundation published an in-depth review of Colombia’s 2020 regulation bill, written by David Restrepo of Centro de Estudios sobre Seguridad y Drogas (CESED).

The report provided a qualitative analysis of coca and cocaine regulation, its effects on the supply system, and the associated benefit and cost outcomes for Colombia.

PAREA 
In 2022, the Beckley Foundation joined the Psychedelic Access and Research European Alliance – a collective of charities, patient groups, non-profits, and psychedelic industry partners aiming to provide evidence-based policy recommendations to the European Union.

The Beckley Foundation Drug Policy Programme 
The Beckley Foundation Drug Policy Programme was created to promote rational discussion on delicate global arrangement issues. It intended to provide drug strategy advice to academics, substance misuse specialists, strategy developers, and the general public. Senior officials, top researchers, and practitioners evaluated the most recent data on the success of drug policies.

International Therapeutic Psilocybin Rescheduling Initiative (ITPRI) 
In 2022, the Beckley Foundation joined in the launch of the International Therapeutic Psilocybin Rescheduling Initiative, a global coalition working to promote and secure a rescheduling of psilocybin under the 1971 Convention on Psychotropic Substances. The ITPRI is seeking a worldwide policy change in order to facilitate research into the therapeutic potential of the substance. Partners of the coalition include the Multidisciplinary Association for Psychedelic Studies (MAPS), Mind Medicine Australia, Drug Science and Open Foundation.

Roadmaps to Regulation: MDMA 2019
This policy proposal published by Amanda Feilding examines the acute, sub-acute, and chronic harms related to MDMA use in detail. The authors examine the production, distribution, purchase, and consumption of the drug; related risks and harms; and the impact prohibition has on these, as well as the potential impact of alternative policies. Crucially, our evidence shows that most harms associated with MDMA use arise from its unregulated status as an illegal drug, and that any risks inherent to MDMA could be more effectively mitigated within a legally regulated market.

Roadmaps to Regulation: New Psychoactive Substances 2016
To coincide with the introduction of the UK’s Psychoactive Substances Act 2016 on 26 May 2016, Amanda Feilding released the report, "Roadmaps to Regulation: New Psychoactive Substances". The document surveys the complex and unique world of NPS production and distribution and suggests a harm reductive model for the legal regulation of this vast array of substances. The NPS report is part of wider family of forthcoming reports, "Roadmaps to Regulation: Cannabis, Psychedelics, MDMA and NPS“.

Public Letter 2016
Recognizing the clear need for the nations and countries of the United Nations to design their own drug policies, tailored to mitigating their individual experiences of the 'War on Drugs', Amanda Feilding attended the 2016 UN General Assembly Special Session on drugs and hosted an official side event at the UN Headquarters in New York. The event marked the launch of the Beckley Foundation’s 2016 Public Letter, "Out of UNGASS: A New Approach" which calls for the abandonment of the 1961 Drug Convention, and for every country to be allowed to implement drug policies that are cost-effective, harm-reductive and respect human rights.

Jamaica's Regulated Cannabis Industry: First Steps 2015
In Spring 2015, Amanda Feilding and the Beckley Foundation were invited by Mark Golding, then the Jamaican Minister of Justice, to advise the government on the formation of a balanced policy in the regulation of the cannabis industry in Jamaica, and to provide feedback on global drug policy issues as Jamaica moved towards the creation of a successfully-regulated cannabis industry. The two-day conference brought together academics, government officials, growers, Rastafari and healthcare professionals. The outcome of these discussions was fed into the process for the 2016 UN General Assembly Special Session (UNGASS) on global drug policy.

Beckley Foundation Guatemala 2012–13
On 3 July 2012 Beckley Foundation Guatemala was launched after the organisation had been asked to convene an international Board of Experts to write reports which would:
 analyse the impact of the current drug prohibitionist policies;
 propose a sophisticated range of alternative policy solutions for Guatemala.

The alternative drug policy solutions were presented to President Otto Pérez Molina by Amanda Feilding in January 2013 in this 'Paths for Reform' report. The suggestions include a proposal to investigate legalising the illicit opium poppy crop in order to produce pain-relieving medications for the Guatemalan people, an initiative that has been mentioned by President Pérez Molina during Davos 2013 and other official appearances

Public Letter 2011
In 2011 an open letter from the Foundation was published in The Times and The Guardian calling for a new approach to drug policy. The letter opened by emphatically stating that the war on drugs has failed and calling for a new approach. Signatories of the letter now include the current Presidents of Colombia (Juan Manuel Santos) and Guatemala (Otto Pérez Molina), and former Presidents of the United States (Jimmy Carter), Mexico, Colombia and Switzerland, as well as Nobel Prize winners and numerous other world figures.

Global Initiative for Drug Policy Reform 2011–12
The Global Initiative for Drug Policy Reform is a collaboration between the All Party Parliamentary Group on Drug Policy, the Global Commission on Drug Policy and the Beckley Foundation. It was held at the House of Lords in November 2011, bringing together representatives from countries interested in reform, and countries that have successfully implemented alternative drug policies, along with the Global Commission on Drug Policy.

Science
The Beckley Foundation is one of the few organisations in the world initiating, supporting, and directing scientific research investigating the effects of currently-controlled psychoactive substances. This ground-breaking research explores how substances such as cannabis, psychedelics, and MDMA act upon the human brain, using the latest developments in neuroscience and brain imaging technology. The purpose of the research is to increase our scientific understanding of consciousness itself, and to explore new avenues for the treatment of illnesses and the betterment of humankind. Over the last 18 years, the Programme has produced dozens of scientific articles published in influential peer-reviewed journals, and Amanda Feilding has spearheaded numerous collaborations. Collaborating partners include leading institutions such as Imperial College London, Sant Pau Hospital, University College London, King’s College London, and Johns Hopkins University, and topics have covered:

 changes in brain structure, function, and blood supply in response to cannabis, LSD, psilocybin, ayahuasca/DMT, and MDMA;
 LSD, psilocybin, and MDMA-assisted psychotherapy for conditions such as depression, anxiety, addiction, and post-traumatic stress disorder (PTSD);
 cannabis and cannabinoids in the treatment of brain cancer;
 LSD in the treatment of cluster headaches; and
 cerebral circulation, cranial compliance, and their relationship to age-related cognitive decline.

Latest findings from the Beckley Foundation scientific programme

Ayahuasca and Neurogenesis 2016
A preliminary study conducted within the framework of the Beckley-Sant Pau Research Programme and in collaboration with the Spanish National Research Council found that harmine and tetrahydroharmine, the alkaloids present in highest amounts in ayahuasca, have potent neurogenic properties (the ability to create new brain cells). The addition of harmine and tetrahydroharmine to cultures containing neural stem cells dramatically increased their differentiation and maturation into neurons.

Psilocybin for Depression 2016 
Based on the Beckley/Imperial Research Programme's psilocybin study brain imaging results, in 2012, the Medical Research Council awarded funding to the programme for a clinical study investigating psilocybin in the treatment of depression. Results from the study, published in the Lancet Psychiatry Journal, showed that two doses of psilocybin lifted depression in all 12 volunteers for three weeks, and kept five of them depression free for three months. The size of the study and the absence of a placebo make the research proof of principle only, but the remarkably positive results highlight the need for continued research in this promising area of psychiatry – psychedelic-assisted therapy. Amanda Feilding and the Beckley Foundation are currently trying to secure funding to expand this research and further evaluate the potential of psilocybin as a treatment for depression.

LSD Revealed 2016
On 13 April 2016, the Beckley/Imperial Research Programme released the world’s first images of the human brain on LSD, collected as part of the first ever brain imaging study to examine the effects of LSD on the human brain. Programme co-directors Amanda Feilding and David Nutt, together with lead-investigator Robin Carhart-Harris, held a press conference at the Royal Society on 11 April 2016 to herald the publication of the paper.

Microdosing
Two separate Beckley Foundation collaborative projects, at Imperial College London and Maastricht University, are carrying out research into the effects of low doses of LSD, also known as microdoses, in humans, in order to investigate its pharmacology and potential benefits for health and wellbeing. The Maastricht project focuses in particular on mood, cognitive functions, and pain management, and has produced evidence for some benefits to microdosing on cognitive function and pain tolerance. At Imperial College, researchers collaborated with the Beckley Foundation on the development of an innovative, naturalistic study design in order to investigate the practice of microdosing in ‘real life’, with a sizeable number of subjects, and for a fraction of the cost of a lab-based study. It represented the first ever psychedelic study to use placebo control outside of the lab, and was completed by 191 participants, making it by far the largest placebo-controlled psychedelic study to date.

Beckley Canopy Therapeutics
News reports in 2018-2019 indicated that the Foundation had been retained by the Canadian cannabis producer Canopy Growth Corporation to conduct research as to the benefits of various strains of its products, particularly in treating pain, anxiety and drug addiction. One goal is to reduce dependence on opioids in treating cancer-related pain. The two formed Beckley Canopy Therapeutics in Oxford, to raise funds from investors for cannabinoid research and drug development.

Canopy Growth has been planning to export its products to the UK. The long-term intent of the partnership is to confirm the value of cannabis in specific conditions and to convince insurers to pay for medical cannabis when used accordingly. Mark Ware, Canopy’s chief medical officer, said in an interview that Feilding's "ability to take a scientific look at what would otherwise be considered as controversial therapeutics makes her a very good partner".

Feilding's son, Cosmo Feilding Mellen, is the managing director of the partnership.

Ongoing projects and collaborations

The Beckley/Maastricht Microdosing Research Programme at Maastricht University in the Netherlands, carrying out research into the effects of LSD microdosing on humans, with a particular focus on mood, cognitive functions, and pain management. The first study, exploring the dose-response relationship in LSD-induced physiological and psychological effects, saw twenty-four healthy volunteers each receive single doses of 5, 10 and 20 micrograms of LSD, or a placebo.

Past projects and collaborations

 The Beckley Foundation/Imperial College London Psychedelic Research Programme, investigating the effects of psilocybin and other psychedelic drugs on cerebral blood flow, and linking this with cognitive effects (for example, improved episodic memory recall and increased vividness of subjective experience under the influence of psilocybin).
The Beckley Foundation Ethnobotanical Research Programme, investigating the effects and potential benefits of Ayahuasca and DMT, including a study involving ketanserin on evaluating the effects of glutamate release by DMT, a study investigating the association between brain plasticity and Ayahuasca, and a long-term study investigating the effect of Ayahuasca on personal development and health.
A Beckley Foundation/Johns Hopkins University collaboration investigating the potential use of psychedelic drugs to treat addiction. A pilot study using psilocybin to treat nicotine addiction produced promising results, leading to a multi-site clinical trial in the USA, funded by NIH, in which the Foundation is not involved.
A Beckley Foundation/King's College London collaboration with Dr Paul Morrison at the Institute of Psychiatry investigating the differing effects of delta-9-tetrahydrocannabinol (THC) and cannabidiol (CBD), two of the main cannabinoids found in cannabis that determine its subjective and cognitive effects. Cannabidiol is showing promise in inhibiting the psychosis-like effects of THC, and indicating great therapeutic potential.
A Beckley Foundation/University College London collaboration with Professor Valerie Curran investigating medicinal uses of cannabis.
A Beckley/Imperial Psychedelic Research Programme collaborative study on psychedelic microdosing.

Recent Scientific Journal Publications

Beckley Foundation Press Publications
The Beckley Foundation Press was created to allow the publication of Drug Policy and Scientific material that was not being picked up by mainstream publishing houses due to the controversial nature of the material.
LSD My Problem Child and Insights/Outlooks
Authors: Albert Hofmann. Translated by Jonathan Ott and Edited by Amanda Feilding - Publisher: The Beckley Foundation Press and Oxford University Press (2013). , 248 pages
Cannabis Policy: Moving Beyond Stalemate
Authors: Robin Room, Benedikt Fischer, Wayne Hall, Simon Lenton and Peter Reuter, Convened by Amanda Feilding - 
Publisher: The Beckley Foundation Press and Oxford University Press (2010). 
The Pharmacology of LSD
Authors: Annelie Hintzen M.D. and Torsten Passie M.D., M.A. Paperback: App 200 pages - 
Publisher: The Beckley Foundation Press and Oxford University Press (June 2010)

Hoffmann’s Elixir: LSD and the new Eleusis - Talks & Essays by Albert Hofmann and others
Edited by Amanda Feilding - 
Publisher: Beckley Foundation Press (2010)

Non-Invasive Evaluation of Human Brain Fluid Dynamics and Skull Biomechanics in Relation to Cognitive Functioning

Authors: Yuri Moskalenko, Amanda Feilding and Peter Halvorson - 
Publisher: Beckley Foundation Press (2010)

Major Seminars
 "Drugs and the Brain", Magdalen College, Oxford, (2002).
 "The Role of Drugs in Society", Royal Society, (2003).
 "An Interdisciplinary Perspective on Alcohol and other Recreational Drugs", Cabinet Office, Admiralty Arch, (2003).
 "Global Drug Policy - Future Directions", Westminster Palace, (2004)
 "International Drug Policy Seminar 2005"), House of Lords, Westminster Palace, (2005). A three-day seminar including the Beckley/Foresight Seminar, reviewing the Foresight Report; the meeting of the International Consortium of NGOs, and the meeting of the International Network of Drug Policy Analysis, renamed International Society for the Study of Drug Policy (ISSDP). House of Lords, Westminster Palace
 "UNGASS and the Contribution of Civil Society" House of Lords, Westminster Palace, (2006) 
"The Global Cannabis Commission Report Launch & Assessing International Drug Control- Preparations for UNGASS" House of Lords, Westminster Palace, (2008)
 The Launch of the Global Initiative for Drug Policy Reform. Convened by the Beckley Foundation and launched with the All Party Parliamentary Group - Westminster Palace, (2011)

External links
 The Beckley Foundation

 Breaking the Taboo
 Psychedelic Science.org.uk
 International Drug Policy Consortium
 International Society for the Study of Drug Policy

See also
 Heffter Research Institute
 Multidisciplinary Association for Psychedelic Studies

References

1998 establishments in the United Kingdom
Charities based in Oxfordshire
Drug policy organizations
Drug policy reform
Foundations based in England
Health charities in the United Kingdom